Alibala Hajizade (born 28 August 1935) is an Azerbaijani writer.

Bibliography
Writer Alibala Hajizade was born in Ağalıkənd, Biləsuvar region. He studied in the Persian department of Azerbaijan State University. He began acting as junior scientific worker in the Near and Middle East Institute of Azerbaijan National Academy of Sciences. He worked as a translator in Afghanistan in 1966-70es. He is considered one of the best writers whose works were printed with the highest draws. His novels as "Ayrılıgın sonu yoxmuş"("Endless divergency"), "Dünyanı tanı"("Know the world"), "Vəfalım menim"("My loyal") have been repeatedly published.
He died on 8 October 2009.

Works
 "Heykəl gülür" (The monument laughs) (stories), Baku, Uşaqgəncnəşr, 1961, 54 pages
 Unutmaq olmur (Forgetting is impossible) (novelette), Baku, Uşaqgəncnəşr, 1963, 115 pages
 Məhəbbət olmayan evdə (At home without love) (novelette), Baku,Azərnəşr, 1965, 100 pages
 Fərruxi Yəzdinin poeziyası (Farrux Yazdi's poetry), Baku, Eım, 1965, 198 pages
 Cehiz(Dowry) (stories), Baku, Gənclik, 1969, 154 pages
 Pəhləvan (Giant) (stories), Baku, Gənclik, 1974, 31pages
 Təyyarə kölgəsi (Shadow of plane) (novel), Baku, Gənclik, 1974, 287 pages (repeatedly edition:1992)
 İtkin gəlin (Missed bride) (novel), Baku, Gənclik, 1979, 215 pages
 Əfsanəsiz illər (Years without Afsana) (novel), Baku, Gənclik, 1983,353 pages
 Ayrılığın sonu yoxmuş. (Endless divergency) Baku, Gənclik, 1983, 432 pages
 Vəfalım mənim. (My loyal) Baku, Gənclik, 1985, 344 pages (repeatedly edition:1992)
 Dünyanı tanı. (Know the world ) Baku, Gənclik, 1990, 450 pages
 İtkin gəlin (Missed bride) (novel, trilogy) 1st book. Baku, Azərnəşr, 1992
 İtkin gəlin (Missed bride) (novel, trilogy) 2nd book. Baku, Azərnəşr, 1992
 İtkin gəlin (Missed bride) (novel, trilogy) 3rd book. Baku, Azərnəşr, 1992
 Sevəcəyəm (I shall love) (poems,stories), Baku, Diplomat, 2001, 170 pages
 Əsərləri (Works) (10 volumes), 1st volume, Baku, Nafta-Press, 2004, 501 pages

References

External links
 The literature of the Soviet period (up to 60 years)
 http://mesiha.blogspot.com/2008/04/msuliyyt-v-mhbbt.html

Azerbaijani writers
Living people
1935 births
People from Bilasuvar District
Baku State University alumni